Gloucestershire Water Rescue Centre, also known as Tewkesbury fire station, is a combined project between Severn Area Rescue Association (SARA) and Gloucestershire Fire and Rescue Service (GFRS).

The centre is equipped with two SARA rescue boats (SARA11 & SARA15) and two Land Rovers (MRU3 and MRU11) in their own building. GFRS have two fire engines, one rescue boat and a Land Rover.

Another project will see a new slipway constructed into the River Severn.

References

External links
  Official website

Fire and rescue services of England
Organisations based in Gloucestershire
Lifeboat stations in Gloucestershire